Thunderheart is a 1992 American Neo-Western mystery film directed by Michael Apted from a screenplay by John Fusco. The film is a loosely based fictional portrayal of events relating to the Wounded Knee incident in 1973, when followers of the American Indian Movement seized the South Dakota town of Wounded Knee in protest against federal government policy regarding Native Americans. Incorporated in the plot is the character of Ray Levoi, played by actor Val Kilmer, as an FBI agent with Sioux heritage investigating a homicide on a Native American reservation. Sam Shepard, Graham Greene, Fred Ward and Sheila Tousey star in principal supporting roles. Also in 1992, Apted had previously directed a documentary surrounding a Native American activist episode involving the murder of FBI agents titled Incident at Oglala. The documentary depicts the indictment of activist Leonard Peltier during a 1975 shootout on the Pine Ridge Indian Reservation.

The film was a co-production between the motion picture studios of TriStar Pictures, Tribeca Productions, and Waterhorse Productions. It was commercially distributed by TriStar Pictures theatrically, and by Columbia TriStar Home Video for home media. Thunderheart explores civil topics, such as discrimination, political activism and murder. Following its cinematic release, the film garnered several award nominations from the Political Film Society. On November 24, 1992, the Original Motion Picture Soundtrack was released by the Intrada Records label. The film score was composed by musician James Horner.

Thunderheart premiered in theaters in-wide release in the United States on April 3, 1992 grossing $22,660,758 in domestic ticket sales. The film was considered a minor financial success after its theatrical run, and was met with generally positive critical reviews before its initial screening in cinemas.

Plot
Leo Fast Elk, a tribal council member of a Native American reservation in South Dakota, is murdered. FBI Agent William Dawes assigns Agent Ray Levoi to help investigate. The latter is chosen for his mixed Sioux heritage, which might assist in the inquiry as they interview residents of the reservation. Ray is apprehensive as he is disconnected from his heritage and does not speak Lakota. Ray is partnered with veteran Agent Frank "Cooch" Coutelle, who has narrowed down the suspect list to Maggie Eagle Bear, a peaceful Native American political activist and schoolteacher, and Jimmy Looks Twice, leader of the radical Aboriginal Rights Movement (ARM).

Ray and Frank meet tribal police officer Walter Crow Horse at the murder scene. Walter is resistant to their claims of jurisdiction as he generally distrusts the government, and Ray and Frank tell him not to impede their investigation. Frank has already determined that Jimmy Looks Twice is the prime suspect and has been working with tribal council president Jack Milton to apprehend him. Jack has hired an unofficial militia to protect the reservation from Jimmy and the ARM, who oppose the tribal council's efforts to modernize the reservation. Jimmy is successfully caught and taken into custody, but escapes after a gunfight with the FBI and tribal police.

When Walter informs him that the murder took place on Maggie's property, Ray goes to collect evidence and finds bullet casings but is told to leave by Maggie. Ray is initially mocked and ridiculed by the locals (being called a "Washington Redskin"), but tribal elder Grandpa Sam Reaches tells him that he comes from strong Native American blood. Ray returns to Maggie's to question her grandmother, and commends her for her activism. While Ray is visiting, Maggie's son is shot in the arm by Jack's militia, who claim the shooting was actually committed by the ARM. Ray drives Maggie and her son to the hospital, and gets into a fight with Jack's men when they arrive. After witnessing the harrowing conditions and violence from Milton's pro-government faction on the reservation, Ray gradually becomes sensitized to Native American issues.

Although Frank is convinced that Jimmy committed the murder, Walter tells Ray that the killer was heavier than Jimmy is and also stole Leo's car, which was used to take the body from Maggie's property to the dump site. Leo's car is still missing, but Frank dismisses the lead and tells Ray to focus on locating Jimmy instead of talking to Walter. Ray continues to meet with Walter and Grandpa Sam Reaches despite Frank's orders and starts his own investigation off the record. Leo's car is found with a large jacket in the trunk, supporting Walter's claim that the killer was bigger than Jimmy is. Ray surreptitiously takes a raffle ticket stub from the jacket pocket and takes it to Maggie, who organized the raffle, to see if she can identify who it belongs to. Maggie informs Ray that she is concerned about the possibility of contaminated water on the reservation, and thanks him for his help with her son.

Ray visits Grandpa Sam Reaches and finds Jimmy, who he is now convinced is innocent. Ray warns Jimmy to leave quickly or the FBI will kill him, but Jimmy is apprehended by Frank and the rest of the FBI agents who were called in for the manhunt. Much to Frank's anger, Ray comes to suspect a conspiracy and cover-up involving the reservation and Leo's murder. After Jimmy is arrested, Maggie matches the ticket stub for Ray. The ticket was purchased by Richard Yellow Hawk, a convict on the reservation who uses a wheelchair. Ray visits Richard, who admits to killing Leo after Ray tells him to get out of his wheelchair, which he does. Richard confirms that Frank and other FBI agents visited him in prison, offering to reduce his sentence if he did favors for them. Richard stirred up tensions between the ARM and the tribal council, and was effectively blackmailed by Frank under the threat of going back to prison.

After being told to find 'the source', Ray and Walter travel to Red Deer Table, a location that Leo was investigating prior to his death. Ray tells Walter about a dream he had about the Wounded Knee Massacre, in which he was running with other Native Americans from US soldiers. Walter states that Ray had a vision, and that Ray is "Thunderheart", a Native American hero slain at Wounded Knee, who is now reincarnated to deliver them from their current troubles. After arriving at Red Deer Table, the pair come across a government-sponsored plan to strip mine uranium on the reservation. The mining is polluting the water supply and fueling the bloody conflict between the reservation's anti-government ARM and Milton's men. While the land is not owned by Milton, he receives kickbacks from the leases. Ray and Crow Horse discover Maggie's body at the site. Ray rushes back to Richard, but finds him dead in his wheelchair, his wrists slit to make his death look like a suicide.

Walter and Ray are pursued by Frank, Jack, and his pro-government collaborators. Ray reveals that he recorded Richard's confession, implicating Frank in Leo's murder. Ray and Walter are eventually cornered but before they can be killed, the ARM shows up to protect them. Frank and Jack are apprehended after being cornered and outnumbered by the armed resistance. Ray, disillusioned by the corruption, leaves the FBI.

Cast

 Val Kilmer as FBI Agent Ray Levoi
 Sam Shepard as FBI Agent Frank 'Cooch' Coutelle
 Graham Greene as Walter Crow Horse
 Fred Ward as Jack Milton
 Fred Thompson as William Dawes
 Sheila Tousey as Maggie Eagle Bear
 Ted Thin Elk as Grandpa Sam Reaches
 John Trudell as Jimmy Looks Twice
 Julius Drum as Richard Yellow Hawk
 Sarah Brave as Grandma Maisy Blue Legs
 Allan R.J. Joseph as Leo Fast Elk
 Sylvan Pumpkin Seed as Hobart
 Patrick Massett as FBI Agent Mackey
 Rex Linn as FBI Agent
 Brian A. O'Meara as FBI Agent

Production

Filming

The film was shot primarily on location in South Dakota. Specific sets included the Pine Ridge Reservation, which was dubbed the Bear Creek Reservation. Other filming locations used were in the Washington, D.C. area for the opening sequences. The film employed many Indian actors, some of whose screen roles mirror their real lives. The actor John Trudell, who played an Indian activist suspected of murder in the film inspired by the real-life events surrounding Leonard Peltier, is in fact an Indian activist, as well as a poet and singer. Chief Ted Thin Elk, who played an honored Lakota medicine man, was a Lakota elder himself. Badlands National Park and Wounded Knee in South Dakota were also used as backdrop locations for the real-life incidents which took place during the 1970s. Filming was done with the support of the Oglala Sioux people, who trusted Apted and Fusco to express their story.

Soundtrack
The original motion picture soundtrack for Thunderheart was released by the Intrada Records music label on November 24, 1992. The score for the film was composed by James Horner, while original songs written by musical artists Bruce Springsteen, Ali Olmo, and Sonny Lemaire, among others, were used in-between dialogue shots throughout the film. Jim Henrikson edited the film's music.

Marketing

Novel
A paperback novel published by HarperCollins titled Thunderheart based on John Fusco's screenplay, was released on May 28, 1992. The book dramatizes the fictionalized events of the Wounded Knee Incident, as depicted in the film. It expands on the ideas of how an FBI agent's assignment to uncover the truth behind violence on an Indian reservation leads to a wide-range conspiracy.

Reception

Critical response
Rotten Tomatoes reported that 89% of 18 sampled critics gave the film a positive review, with an average score of 6.47 out of 10. Following its cinematic release in 1992, Thunderheart received two nominations from the  Political Film Society Awards in the categories of Exposé and Human Rights.

Chris Hicks, of the Deseret News, said screenwriter Fusco and director Apted created a "rich backdrop, with fascinating character development and a serious focus on the spirituality of Indian beliefs." He commented that "there's a lot more going on in Thunderheart that makes it well worth the trip—not the least of which is the performance of co-star Graham Greene, fresh from his Oscar-nominated Dances With Wolves triumph, wonderful as a wise-cracking American Indian cop." In a mixed review, Variety believed the film found "a lively platform for its essential view that the old ways were far wiser and better." However, they noted that actor Kilmer "holds the screen strongly in an intense young Turk role, but when script calls for him to transform into a mythical Indian savior, he doesn't quite fill the moccasins." Roger Ebert in the Chicago Sun-Times offered a positive review recalling how he thought "what's most absorbing about Thunderheart is its sense of place and time. Apted makes documentaries as well as fiction films, and in such features as Coal Miner's Daughter and Gorillas in the Mist and such documentaries as 35 Up he pays great attention to the people themselves - not just what they do, and how that pushes things along."

Janet Maslin of The New York Times said the film had "the shape of a thriller" and a "documentary's attentiveness to detail". She also said that the "film's outstanding performance comes from Graham Greene, an Oscar nominee for Dances with Wolves, a film that looks like an utter confection beside this plainer, harder-hitting drama.... Mr. Greene proves himself a naturally magnetic actor who deserves to be seen in other, more varied roles." Critic Kathleen Maher for The Austin Chronicle viewed Thunderheart as an "element of misty romanticism about Native Americans that Apted just doesn't manage to pull off. His yarn, however, is a good one even if it could be told a little better." However, she added that "Apted manages to say a lot by cutting between the squalor of life on the reservation to the magnificence of the land around it. Unfortunately, when the characters speak for themselves, they are often forced to deliver lines that are unspeakable." Owen Gleiberman of Entertainment Weekly gave the film a C rating calling it "hokey" and "laborious". He viewed the film as a "leftover 1970s conspiracy thriller were it not for the novelty of its setting: a modern Indian reservation—which, as the movie reveals, is by now a fancy word for slum." He did however compliment actor Greene, calling his performance—the film's "one redeeming feature". Author C.M. of Time Out said that "Apted and cinematographer Roger Deakins focus unblinkingly on the poverty endemic to the reservation. This directness, however, contrasts with an over-complicated script by John Fusco." But he acknowledged that "the story boasts integrity and serves as a forceful indictment of on-going injustice."

Sean Axmaker of Turner Classic Movies boasted on the film's merits by declaring, "Thunderheart dispenses with clichés of Indian culture while respectfully showing the traditions kept alive on the reservation and exposing conditions on the reservation, all within the conventions of an entertaining and involving Hollywood murder mystery with a message." Rating 3 Stars, Leonard Maltin wrote that the film was an "engrossing thriller" that is "notable for its keen attention to detail regarding Sioux customs and spirituality, and its enlightened point of view."

Box office
The film premiered in cinemas on April 3, 1992 in wide release throughout the U.S.. During its opening weekend, the film opened in 5th place grossing $4,507,425 in business showing at 1,035 locations. The film White Men Can't Jump came in first place during that weekend grossing $10,188,583. The film's revenue dropped by 26% in its second week of release, earning $3,324,500. For that particular weekend, the film fell to 8th place screening in 1,090 theaters. The film Sleepwalkers unseated White Men Can't Jump to open in first place grossing $10,017,354 in box office revenue. During its final weekend in release, Thunderheart opened in a distant 14th place with $1,111,110 in revenue. The film went on to top out domestically at $22,660,758 in total ticket sales through a six-week theatrical run. For 1992 as a whole, the film would cumulatively rank at a box office performance position of 55.

Home media
Following its theatrical release, the film was released on VHS video format on July 8, 1994. The Region 1 Code widescreen edition of the film was released on DVD in the United States on September 29, 1998.  Currently, there is no scheduled release date set for a future Blu-ray Disc version of the film, although it is available in other media formats such as video on demand.

See also

 1992 in film
 American Indian Movement
 Incident at Oglala
 Wounded Knee incident
 Wounded Knee Massacre

References

Further reading 

 
 
 
 Claypoole, Antoinette Nora (2013).  Ghost Rider Roads: Inside the American Indian Movement. Wild Embers Press.  ASIN 1475048580.

External links
 
 
 
 
 
 Thunderheart at the Movie Review Query Engine

1990s English-language films
1992 Western (genre) films
1992 films
American mystery films
American Western (genre) films
American detective films
Films scored by James Horner
Films about Native Americans
Films about race and ethnicity
American films based on actual events
Films directed by Michael Apted
Films produced by John Fusco
Films produced by Robert De Niro
Films set in South Dakota
Films set in the 1970s
Films set in Washington, D.C.
Films shot in South Dakota
Films shot in Washington, D.C.
Films with screenplays by John Fusco
Sioux
TriStar Pictures films
Pine Ridge Indian Reservation
1990s American films